The School District of Mystery Lake provides educational services in the city of Thompson, Manitoba at six elementary schools and one high school. The School District of Mystery Lake offers programs in both English and French languages.

During the late 1990s, it was recognized that many of the cultural and language needs of First Nations peoples in northern Manitoba were not being adequately addressed by the predominantly English school system. Programming that encourages the use of Cree language has been initiated by the school district to address these needs. The staff of Wapanohk - Eastwood Community School have worked closely with the Manitoba First Nations Education Resource Centre in program development. Approximately half of the instructional and support staff of Wapanohk - Eastwood Community School are speakers of the Cree language, and the student population is an estimated 80 - 85% Cree.

List of Schools

Elementary

Secondary
R.D. Parker Collegiate (Grade: 9–12)

Past

Sports

Knights of Columbus
(Indoor Track Meet)

Grades Four(4) to Eight(8), every April all six(6) Elementary Schools participate in the annual event.

The following are the events, High Jump, Shot Put, 50 Metres, 300 Metres, 1000 Metres, CO-ED Relay and 4x1 Relay.

This event takes place in the C.A. Nesbitt Arena of the Thompson Recreational Centre which is located near the R.D. Parker Collegiate.

Notable alumni
Hon. Steve Ashton, Member of the Manitoba Legislative Assembly

See also
List of school districts in Manitoba

References

External links
Burntwood Elementary School
Deerwood Elementary School
Ecole Riverside School 
Juniper Elementary School
Wapanohk Community School
Westwood Elementary School
R.D. Parker Collegiate
Manitoba Education
The School District of Mystery Lake

School districts in Manitoba
Education in Thompson, Manitoba